Donnie Shell (born August 26, 1952) is an American former professional football player who was a strong safety for the Pittsburgh Steelers of the National Football League (NFL) between 1974 and 1987. Shell was a member of the Steelers famed Steel Curtain defense in the 1970s.

Shell retired as the NFL strong safety career leader in interceptions with 51. He started 11 consecutive seasons for the Steelers and was selected to the Steelers All-Time Team, the College Football Hall of Fame, the Pro Football Hall of Fame (Class of 2020), and to the NFL Silver Anniversary Super Bowl Team.

Early life 
Shell grew up in the town of Whitmire, South Carolina. He played on the Whitmire High School football team, where in his senior season as a linebacker, his team did not allow a single touchdown by opponents. Shell played college football for Willie Jeffries at South Carolina State University, where he was teammates with future New York Giants and Hall of Fame linebacker Harry Carson and earned All-American and all conference honors. He was inducted into the College Football Hall of Fame in 1998. Shell was signed undrafted by the Steelers, where he played his entire career, winning four Super Bowls with the Steeler teams of the 1970s.

Shell is a member of Groove Phi Groove Social Fellowship Incorporated.

NFL career 
Shell was a five-time Pro Bowler between 1978 and 1982, a 4-time All-Pro selection, and was the Steelers team MVP in 1980. He saved several possible six points in Super Bowl XIII and Super Bowl XIV. He had been in the top 15 in balloting for the Pro Football Hall of Fame once before, in 2002 but with no success.  The Professional Football Researchers Association named Shell to the PRFA Hall of Very Good Class of 2013 

In 2019, despite not being in the Pro Football Hall of Fame, he was chosen as a finalist for the NFL’s 100th Anniversary Team

Shell resides in Rock Hill, South Carolina and was the Carolina Panthers Director of Player Development from 1994 to 2009.

He played in 201 games for the Steelers, only behind other Steelers legends like Ben Roethlisberger (249), Hall of Famer Mike Webster (220) and Hines Ward (who played in 217 games).

On January 15, 2020, Shell was announced as a member of the Pro Football Hall of Fame's Centennial Class of 2020. He was inducted by Tony Dungy, another Hall of Famer and Steelers legend.

Post-retirement 
Shell previously served as Director of Spiritual Life at Johnson C. Smith University in Charlotte, North Carolina. He currently lives in South Carolina and has three children and three grandchildren.

References

1952 births
Living people
American football safeties
Pittsburgh Steelers players
Players of American football from South Carolina
South Carolina State Bulldogs football players
American Conference Pro Bowl players
College Football Hall of Fame inductees
People from Whitmire, South Carolina
Pro Football Hall of Fame inductees